Dominican Republic is scheduled to compete at the 2024 Summer Olympics in Paris from 26 July to 11 August 2024. It will be the nation's sixteenth consecutive appearance at the Summer Olympics.

Competitors
The following is the list of number of competitors in the Games.

Football

Summary

Men's tournament

Dominican Republic men's football team  qualified for the Olympics by advancing to the final match at the 2022 CONCACAF U-20 Championship in Honduras, marking the country's debut in the sport.

Team roster
 Men's team event – one team of 18 players

See also
Dominican Republic at the 2023 Pan American Games

References

Nations at the 2024 Summer Olympics
2024
2024 in Dominican Republic sport